Haploembia tarsalis or the pink webspinner is a species of webspinner in the family Oligotomidae. It is originally from the Mediterranean, but was introduced to California before the 20th Century. H. tarsalis reproduces asexually through parthenogenesis, and only females are known. Adults are wingless, between 8-11 mm in length, and vary in color from pale orange to black. They live in silk tunnels that they spin in soil, leaf litter, and under stones and other debris.

References 

Embioptera
Insects described in 1940
Unisexual animals
Asexual reproduction in animals